Lee Castle (February 28, 1915 – November 16, 1990) was an American jazz trumpeter and bandleader. He was born Lee Aniello Castaldo, and performed under this name early in his career.

His first major professional job was with Joe Haymes in 1935; following this he worked with Artie Shaw (1936, 1941), Tommy Dorsey (1937-41; also studied under Dorsey's father), Jack Teagarden, Glenn Miller (1939), Will Bradley (1941), and Benny Goodman (1943). He put together his own band in 1938, and continued to lead off and on through the 1940s. He adopted the name Lee Castle in 1942.

In 1953, he returned to duty under Tommy Dorsey and his brother Jimmy Dorsey; after Jimmy's death, Castle became the leader of his ensemble, remaining in the position until the 1980s.

References
Footnotes

General references
[ Lee Castle] at AllMusic
Leonard Feather and Ira Gitler, The Biographical Encyclopedia of Jazz. Oxford, 1999, p. 117. 

1915 births
1990 deaths
American jazz trumpeters
American male trumpeters
American jazz bandleaders
Challenge Records artists
20th-century American musicians
20th-century trumpeters
20th-century American male musicians
American male jazz musicians